The 52nd Rifle Division was an infantry division of the Red Army during the Russian Civil War, the interwar period, World War II, and the Cold War, formed once during the Russian Civil War and three times during the existence of the Soviet Union.

The Western Rifle Division was formed during the Russian Civil War, and later redesignated the 52nd Rifle Division. Most of its members were Poles until mid-1919. It was reduced to a brigade and disbanded after the end of the Russian Civil War in 1921. The first formation of the 52nd during the existence of the Soviet Union occurred during the interwar period in 1935. After the first formation of the division was promoted to Guards status as the 10th Guards Rifle Division during World War II in late December 1941, a second formation of the division fought on for the duration in several Fronts. The second formation was disbanded in 1946 after the end of the war. A third formation of the division was formed by renumbering the 315th Rifle Division in 1955 during the Cold War, becoming a motor rifle division in 1957.

Russian Civil War 
The Western Division was formed in August 1918 in the area of Moscow and Tambov at the initiative of Social Democracy of the Kingdom of Poland and Lithuania (SDKPiL) and the Polish Socialist Party-Left (PPS-Lewica), part of the Moscow Military District. A Polish communist regiment, the Red Regiment of Revolutionary Warsaw (Czerwony Pułk Rewolucyjnej Warszawy) made up its cadre, and in the beginning it was mostly composed of Polish volunteers. According to its order of battle (below) each of its brigades consisted of two battalions of infantry and one battalion of cavalry.

During the Polish-Soviet War it was part of the Western Army from November of that year, and it fought against the Lithuanian and Belarusian Self-Defence units and later the Polish Army of the newly created Second Polish Republic in the opening phase of the Polish-Soviet War. Spearheading the Russian westward offensive of 1918-1919 ('Target Vistula') it took Wilno in January 1919; it sustained heavy losses during the fights at Baranowicze against forces of Gen. Stanisław Szeptycki (part of Operation Wilno, a Polish counteroffensive).

Following these losses, in June 1919 the division was heavily reinforced with Russians, Belarusians and Ukrainians and lost its Polish character; it was then (9 June) renamed as 52nd Rifle Division of the Red Army. Commanders of the division were commissars Stanisław Bobiński and Stefan Żbikowski. Between March and July, the division fought against Polish troops in the area of Minsk and Molodechno. In August it fought in the direction of Baranovichi, then in the area of Borisov and Berezino in September and October, and in the area of Lepel in November.

In November, the 52nd was transferred south to join the 14th Army, fighting against the Armed Forces of South Russia on the Southern Front. The division transferred to the 8th Army in December, to the 9th Army in February 1920, and to the 13th Army in April. It fought against Pyotr Wrangel's White Army in Crimea, advancing towards Melitopol between May and July. In August and September the 52nd fought in the defense of the Kakhovka bridgehead. In September it was transferred to the 6th Army, fighting in the Northern Taurida operation of the Southern Front in October and November. During the operation, the 52nd fought in the area of Agayman and Nyzhni Sirohozy, and was temporarily directly subordinated to the front command in November. Between 7 and 17 November, the division fought in the Perekop–Chongar operation, crossing the Sivash and helping to capture the Ishun fortified position. The operation concluded with the final defeat and evacuation of the White Army in Crimea.

In December, the 52nd protected the Black Sea coast in the estuaries of the Dnieper and Bug. On 13 December it received the honorific Yekaterinburg. In early 1921, the division participated in the suppression of anarchist leader Nestor Makhno's Revolutionary Insurrectionary Army of Ukraine in the Nikolayev area. In accordance with orders of the Kharkov Military District of 23 April and 11 June and a 6th Army order of 29 April, the 52nd was reorganized as the 52nd Separate Rifle Brigade, directly subordinated to the district headquarters. It was soon renumbered as the 136th and by a district order of 12 October was used to form the 1st Brigade of the 25th Rifle Division.

First formation 

In accordance with a Moscow Military District directive of 11 April 1935, the division was formed at Yaroslavl from a cadre provided by the 18th Rifle Division. It was part of the Moscow Military District until 1936, when it relocated to the Belorussian Military District. The 52nd Rifle Division took part in the invasion of Poland in 1939 and the Winter War with Finland from November 1939 to March 1940. It became part of the Leningrad Military District for the latter.

At the outbreak of the German invasion in 1941, the 52nd was in the far north, near Murmansk. On 25 June, the 158th and 112th Regiments were transferred by sea to the 14th Rifle Division. Due to its skill in defending the vital port of Murmansk the 52nd Rifle Division became one of the first and few formations raised to Guards status in the Arctic, as the 10th Guards Rifle Division on Dec. 26.  The division remained in that region until late 1944, when it was transferred to 2nd Belorussian Front and took part in the invasion of Germany.

Second Formation 

A new 52nd Rifle Division formed on Mar. 1, 1942 at Kolomna in the Moscow Military District.

The division was completed in about three months. It arrived at the front in late July 1942, as part of 30th Army, in Kalinin Front, just in time to participate in the First Rzhev–Sychyovka Offensive Operation. The 52nd, along with the rest of 30th Army, was transferred to Western Front in August. The division was quickly worn down in these battles of attrition very near the town of Rzhev but, along with the 2nd and 16th Guards Rifle Divisions, was able to liberate the key village of Polunino and advance 6 km to the outskirts of the town during the following months.

After rebuilding, on the last day of 1942 the 52nd began moving south to Southwestern Front. It took part in the Soviet offensive towards Kharkov in early 1943, serving at various times in the 1st Guards Army, the Popov Mobile Group, and the 3rd Tank Army. This effort did not go well for the division, as it was assaulted and partially overrun by German forces. By the end of the winter the 52nd was in 57th Army, the former 3rd Tank Army, where it remained with few exceptions until the end of 1944. From March to July the division was dug in along the line of the Donets River.

In August 1943, the division moved with 57th Army to Steppe Front, coming under command of Col. A.Ia. Maksimov on Aug. 12. From the end of September to Oct. 26 it was in reserves, at Merefa near Kharkov, an indication of how much damage it had suffered in the pursuit of German forces after the Battle of Kursk, during which time it assisted in the liberation of Kharkov and Krasnograd. At the end of November it joined 64th Rifle Corps.

The 52nd entered and helped expand the Soviet Kremenchug-Dnepropetrovsk bridgehead across the Dnepr River before digging in along the Ingulets River for the winter. Along with its 57th Army, the division was moved to 3rd Ukrainian Front in February 1944, and took part in the successful early stages of the spring offensive to the Dniestr River, before being halted in the First Jassy–Kishinev Offensive. In August a new offensive was launched, and the 52nd played a role in the destruction of the German and Romanian forces in this southern sector. After the capture of Belgrade on Oct. 20, due to losses the division again went into reserves in the town of Ruma, rebuilding to a strength of 6,000 men by the end of December. The division was awarded the Order of the Red Banner in recognition of its "courage and valor" in the capture of Belgrade on 14 November.

In January 1945, 52nd was transferred to 4th Guards Army, and later that same month to 46th Army, which was shifted to 2nd Ukrainian Front in March. In April the division was given part of the credit for the capture of Vienna and got that city's name as an honorific. On 1 May 1945 the division was with 18th Guards Rifle Corps, 53rd Army, in 2nd Ukrainian Front, alongside 109th Guards Rifle Division and 317th Rifle Division. It ended the war with Germany fighting near Prague.

Along with its Army, the division was railed across Siberia to take part in the Soviet invasion of Manchuria. On 9 August 1945 the 52nd Rifle Division was with 57th Rifle Corps, in the 53rd Army, Transbaikal Front. It saw little combat with Japanese forces and ended the war in southern Manchuria. It carried the official title of 52nd Rifle, Shumlinskaya-Vienna, Twice Order of the Red Banner, Order of Suvorov Division. (Russian: 52-я стрелковая Шумлинская-Венская дважды Краснознамённая ордена Суворова дивизия)

After the war, the division relocated with the 66th Rifle Corps to the Odessa Military District at Haivoron. It became the 43rd Rifle Brigade there and disbanded in December 1946.

Third Formation 
In 1955, it was reformed from the 315th Rifle Division at Kerch, part of the Tauric Military District. It became the 52nd Motor Rifle Division on 17 May 1957.

References

Citations

Bibliography 

 

Infantry divisions of the Soviet Union
052
Military units and formations established in 1918
Military units and formations disestablished in 1957
Military units and formations of the Soviet invasion of Poland
Military units and formations of the Soviet Union in the Winter War